Two ships of the Royal Norwegian Navy have borne the name HNoMS Stegg. Stegg is the Norwegian term for the male grouse.:

  was a  launched in 1921 and sunk by Kriegsmarine vessels in the Hardangerfjord on 20 April 1940.
  was a  fast patrol boat commissioned on 18 March 1980 and decommissioned by 2008.

Royal Norwegian Navy ship names